The 2005 Troy Trojans football team represented Troy University as a member of the Sun Belt Conference during the 2005 NCAA Division I-A football season. Led by 15th-year head coach Larry Blakeney, the Trojans compiled an overall record of 4–7 with a mark of 3–4 in conference play, tying for fourth place in the Sun Belt. The team played home games at Movie Gallery Stadium in Troy, Alabama.

Schedule

References

Troy
Troy Trojans football seasons
Troy Trojans football